Richard "Dick" Newman (9 August 1924 – 3 August 2014) was an Australian cricketer. He played four first-class matches for Tasmania between 1951 and 1953.

See also
 List of Tasmanian representative cricketers

References

External links
 

1924 births
2014 deaths
Australian cricketers
Tasmania cricketers
Cricketers from Melbourne
People from Brunswick, Victoria